Chloride intracellular channel protein 5 is a protein that in humans is encoded by the CLIC5 gene.

Expression and localization 

CLIC5 exists in two alternative splice variants, a smaller CLIC5A and larger CLIC5B protein.

CLIC5A is expressed chiefly in the renal glomerulus, specifically in podocytes. Within the cell, CLIC5A is localized to the plasma membrane and the cytosol, and associates and is regulated by the actin cytoskeleton. CLIC5A can form ion channels in vitro and its channel activity is regulated by actin, though measurement of its chloride conductance in vitro suggests that CLIC5A is equally selective for cations and anions. Even so, the function of CLICs as bona fide ion channels is controversial and has been disputed.

Function 

Although chloride intracellular channel (CLIC) proteins were thought to be involved in ion transport in subcellular compartments, their actual functions suggest their role in diverse cellular and physiological functions including apoptosis and angiogenesis in CLIC1.

CLIC5A, through its interactions with the small GTPase Rac1, induces the phosphorylation of ezrin-moeisin-radixin (ERM) proteins and localized production of the phosphoinositide phosphatidylinositol-4,5-bisphosphate. These two events activate ezrin, enabling it to couple transmembrane proteins to the actin cytoskeleton, which could represent a mechanism by which podocyte foot processes form to enable renal filtration.

Clinical relevance 

Two human families with loss-of-function CLIC5 mutations have been reported, with a total of 5 affected individuals. CLIC5 deficiency results in progressive hearing loss by the second decade, vestibular abnormalities, and kidney dysfunction.

CLIC5A deficiency in mouse models potentiates glomerular injury in hypertension. In these mice, podocyte foot processes were also more sparse and disperse than in wild-type mice.

See also 
 Chloride channel

References

Further reading

External links 
 
 

Ion channels